Lamplugh Glacier is an 8-mile-long (13 km) glacier located in Glacier Bay National Park and Preserve in the U.S. state of Alaska. It leads north to its 1961 terminus in Johns Hopkins Inlet, 1.4 miles (2.3 km) west of Ptarmigan Creek and 76 miles (122 km) northwest of Hoonah. The glacier was named by Lawrence Martin of the U.S. Geological Survey around 1912 for English geologist George William Lamplugh (1859–1926), who visited Glacier Bay in 1884.

On 28 June 2016, a  mountainside collapsed onto Lamplugh Glacier, causing a landslide with a volume of between  that dropped  of rock and debris onto the glacier.

References

See also
 List of glaciers

Glaciers of Glacier Bay National Park and Preserve
Glaciers of Hoonah–Angoon Census Area, Alaska
Glaciers of Unorganized Borough, Alaska